Charles Sumner Howe (September 29, 1858 – April 18, 1939) was the second president of Case School of Applied Science, now Case Western Reserve University.

Howe was born on September 29, 1858 in Nashua, New Hampshire.  He earned his B.S. at both Massachusetts Agricultural College (now known as the University of Massachusetts Amherst) and Boston University in 1878 and his PhD from the College of Wooster in 1887.

As an initiate of Phi Sigma Kappa in 1876, he served as the first president of the Grand Chapter of Phi Sigma Kappa in 1878 while at its founding school of Massachusetts Agricultural College.

Howe served as principal of Longmeadow High School of Massachusetts in 1879.  He moved west where he became the principal of the Academy of Albuquerque in New Mexico from 1879–1881, and was involved in mineral prospecting serving as an assayer for prospectors in Albuquerque until 1882.

Howe married Abbie A. Waite on May 22, 1882, and together had three children.

From 1883–1889, Howe served as the Professor of Mathematics and Astronomy at Buchtel College in Akron, Ohio.  He went to Case School of Applied Science in 1889 where he was also Professor of Mathematics and Astronomy until 1902. Notably, Howe brought the first German-made Riefler clock, then considered the world's best, to America, with his own modifications making it the most accurate timepiece in the world. He maintained being the Kerr Professor of Mathematics at Case School of Applied Science from 1890–1908.

In 1902, Howe became the second president of Case School of Applied Science in Cleveland, Ohio, holding the office until 1929.  During his tenure, he maintained a close relationship with influential Clevelanders, such as John D. Rockefeller, Worcester Warner, and Ambrose Swasey.

Howe served as the national president of the Society for the Promotion of Engineering Education (SPEE) from 1907–1908, known today as the American Society for Engineering Education (ASEE), and served civically as the president of the Cleveland Chamber of Commerce.

Howe is buried at Glendale Cemetery in Akron, Ohio.

References

External links
 Case Western Reserve University bio 
 

1858 births
1939 deaths
Burials at Glendale Cemetery, Akron
Boston University alumni
Case Western Reserve University faculty
College of Wooster alumni
People from Nashua, New Hampshire
University of Akron faculty
Massachusetts Agricultural College alumni
Presidents of Case Western Reserve University